The India national cricket team toured Australia in the 1967–68 season and played a four-match Test series against Australia. Australia won the Test series 4–0.

In all first-class matches, the Indians lost to Western Australia and South Australia, and drew with Victoria, Tasmania and New South Wales. The first-class match against Queensland was abandoned without a ball being bowled.

The Indians went on after this tour to play four Test matches and two other games in New Zealand – see Indian cricket team in New Zealand in 1967-68.

Indian team
 Nawab of Pataudi (captain)
 Chandu Borde (vice-captain)
 Syed Abid Ali
 Bishan Bedi
 Bhagwat Chandrasekhar
 Ramakant Desai
 Farokh Engineer
 Indrajitsinhji
 M. L. Jaisimha
 Umesh Kulkarni
 Bapu Nadkarni
 Erapalli Prasanna
 Dilip Sardesai
 Ramesh Saxena
 Venkataraman Subramanya
 Rusi Surti
 Ajit Wadekar

The manager was Ghulam Ahmed.

India's squad of 16 members for the tour of Australia and New Zealand was announced on 8 November 1967. Five changes were made from the side that toured England earlier that year — Subrata Guha, Sadanand Mohol, Budhi Kunderan, Hanumant Singh and S. Venkataraghavan were replaced by Ramakant Desai, Umesh Kulkarni, Indrajitsinhji, Bapu Nadkarni and Syed Abid Ali.

All the players had played Tests before except for Abid Ali and Kulkarni, who made their debuts in the Tests against Australia. Jaisimha was not in the original team, but was added to the side after the Second Test.

Tour games

One-day: Western Australia Country v Indians 

The Western Australia Country side was captained by Merv Hosking who won the toss and sent the Indians to bat first. Ajit Wadekar top-scored for the Indians making 96, which included 16 boundaries. They declared the innings after scoring 259 in almost three hours. In reply, Western Australia Country ended at 5/189 at stumps. Hosking and Barry Pascoe put together 88 runs for the first wicket.

Test series

First test

Second Test

Third Test

Fourth Test

References

Annual reviews
 Playfair Cricket Annual 1968
 Wisden Cricketers' Almanack 1969

Further reading
 Bill Frindall, The Wisden Book of Test Cricket 1877-1978, Wisden, 1979
 Chris Harte, A History of Australian Cricket, Andre Deutsch, 1993
 Ray Robinson, On Top Down Under, Cassell, 1975
 Ramachandra Guha, A Corner of a Foreign Field - An Indian History of a British Sport, Picador, 2001

External links
 Tour home at ESPNcricinfo
 

1967 in Australian cricket
1967 in Indian cricket
1968 in Australian cricket
1968 in Indian cricket
Australian cricket seasons from 1945–46 to 1969–70
1967-68
International cricket competitions from 1960–61 to 1970